Shoal Point is a coastal suburb in the Mackay Region, Queensland, Australia. In the  Shoal Point had a population of 977 people.

Geography
Shoal Point is a headland at the north-east of the locality.

The waters and inlets of the Coral Sea form the eastern and northern boundaries, and most of the western.

History 
In the  Shoal Point had a population of 977 people.

Amenities 
The Mackay Regional Council operates a mobile library service on a fortnightly schedule at O'Brien Esplanade.

References

Mackay Region
Suburbs of Mackay, Queensland